John B. Weaver is the dean of library services and educational technology at Abilene Christian University.

Life
John B. Weaver was raised in Northwest Arkansas, the grandson of two evangelists among the Churches of Christ.  He completed his undergraduate work at the University of Arkansas. After graduate work at the University of Chicago and the University of South Carolina, he completed his Ph.D. in 2004 at Emory University. He worked as a theological librarian at Emory and a library director at Columbia University before starting his career as the dean of library services and educational technology at Abilene Christian University in 2011. In 2019, he was appointed Academic Dean, the chief academic officer at Florida College, a faith-based liberal-arts college in Temple Terrace, Florida.  Dr. Weaver has served as a Christian evangelist in six states and four countries, and has served academic institutions as the president of the American Theological Library Association. He has authored many article/essays and two books, including Plots of Epiphany: Prison Escape in the Acts of the Apostles.

Education
 B.A. University of Arkansas (1995)
 A.M. University of Chicago (1998)
 M.L.I.S. University of South Carolina (2004)
 Ph.D. Emory University (2004)

Publications

  "The Bible in the Electronic Age,” in Oxford Handbook of the Bible in America (Oxford: Oxford University Press, forthcoming).
  “Transforming Practice: American Bible Reading in Digital Culture,” in The Bible in American Life (Oxford: Oxford University Press, forthcoming)
 “The American Theological Library Association (ATLA) as Community of Faith: Surveying Members’ Relationship to Religious Faith.”  ATLA Summary of Proceedings (2015, Forthcoming)
 “Libraries, Makerspaces, and Constructionist Learning: The Maker Lab at Abilene Christian University.”  ATLA Summary of Proceedings (2014)
 “TCAL Task Force on Shared Print Collections: Report to the Board of the Texas Council of Academic Libraries (TCAL).”  June 2, 2014.
 “The Theological Library in the Age of Technology.”  In Trust Magazine (Summer 2013).
 “Trust in Libraries: 2012 ATLA Presidential Address.”  ATLA Summary of Proceedings (2012)
 “Technology for ministry: pedagogy for theological practices with new media.” ATLA Summary of Proceedings (2011): 195-196.
 “Accordance Bible Software in Reading and Teaching: The Difference a Digital Text Makes.” Advances in the Study of Information and Religion 1  (2011): 225-231.
 “BibleWorks Software in Reading and Teaching: The Difference a Digital Text Makes.” ATLA Summary of Proceedings (2010).
 “Theological Libraries and The Next Christendom: Connecting North American Theological Education to Uses of the Book in the Global South,” Theological Librarianship 1.2 (Winter 2008): 38-48.
 “The Noble and Good Heart: Kalokagathia in Luke’s Parable of the Sower,” in Scripture and Traditions: Essays on Early Judaism and Christianity in Honor of Carl R. Holladay. Edited by Patrick Gray and Gail R. O'Day. Leiden: Brill, 2008, 151-171.
 “Narratives of Reading in Luke-Acts,” in Theological Librarianship 1.1 (June 2008): 22-37.
 “New Faces, New Readers: Uses of the Book in the “Next Christendom,” ATLA Summary of Proceedings (2008).
 “Inspiring Places: Cultivating a Culture of Customer Service in Theological Libraries,” ATLA Summary of Proceedings (2008).
 “Assessing the Reference Librarian as a Collaborative Knowledge Worker.” ATLA Summary of Proceedings (2007).
 “Raising the Standard: Library Workshops and the Requirements for ATS Accreditation.” ATLA Summary of Proceedings (2007).
 “Special Collections and the Seeds of Virtue and Knowledge,” ATLA Summary of Proceedings (2006): 207-13.
 “Search Engines, Databases, and the Contexts of Information Literacy Instruction,” ATLA Summary of Proceedings (2006): 234-40.
 “Models for Information Literacy,” ATLA Summary of Proceedings (2005): 159.
 “Teaching the Unity of Luke-Acts,” Pages 330-331 in Teaching the Bible: Practical Strategies for Classroom Instruction.  Edited by Mark Roncace and Patrick Gray. Atlanta: Society of Biblical Literature, 2005.
 “The Nature of History in Acts of the Apostles,” Pages 335-336 in Teaching the Bible: Practical Strategies for Classroom Instruction.  Edited by Mark Roncace and Patrick Gray. Atlanta: Society of Biblical Literature, 2005.

References

Abilene Christian University faculty
Year of birth missing (living people)
Living people
University of Arkansas alumni
Emory University alumni
Columbia University librarians